Hanjin Shipping Co., Ltd. was a South Korean integrated logistics and container transport company. Prior to its liquidation, Hanjin Shipping was South Korea's largest container line and one of the world's top ten container carriers in terms of capacity.

History
Cho Choong Hoon the founder of Hanjin started at the end of World War II, in November 1945 with a single truck in the port city of Inchon. Early on, its biggest customer was the U.S. Army, providing the transportation of material to both Korea and Vietnam. The company signed a major contract with the US 8th Army in November 1956, and another contract in March 1966, with all of the U.S. armed forces in Vietnam, including the Army, Navy, and Air Force. In November 1969, Hanjin made its entry into the containerized shipping business signing a deal with Sea-Land Service, Inc. In September 1970, the company opened its first container yard at the port of Busan.

The late 1970s saw a major push into the Middle East with contracts signed to Kuwait at the port of Shuwaik (September 1977), Saudi Arabia at the port of Dammam (March 1979), and at the port of Jeddah (May 1980). In August 1992, the company started to load and unload cargo at the ports of Long Beach and Seattle with the joint venture Total Terminals International LLC.

Operations

Hanjin shipping formerly operated some 60 liner and tramper services around the globe, transporting over 100 million tons of cargo annually. Its fleet consisted of many container ships, bulk and LNG carriers. Hanjin Shipping had its own subsidiaries dedicated to ocean transportation and terminal operation and it had several branch offices in various countries. Hanjin-Senator once was the seventh largest container transportation and shipping company in the world (operations ceased February 2009).

After Hanjin's founder, Cho Choong-hoon, died in 2002, his eldest son, Cho Yang-ho, inherited KAL, when his third son, Cho Soo-ho, was handed Hanjin Shipping. Cho Soo-ho died from lung cancer in 2006 and his widow, Choi Eun-young, became the chairwoman of Hanjin Shipping in the following year.

Downfall
Hanjin Shipping's insolvency was caused in part by overcapacity in the container ship industry.

Pre the 2008 Global Recession, global trade had been rising fast, reflected in the fast rising container shipping rates. Reacting to competitors such as Maersk ordering new larger ships, Hanjin placed orders for 250,000TEU of new ships from 2008 onwards. However, less than two months after placing the new ship orders, the 2008 Global Recession started, with the bankruptcy of Lehman Brothers.

Hanjin handled a major portion of the traffic on the transpacific lane (Asia to Americas) and Asia-Europe lane. Thus, as these economies retracted, they had a major and direct bearing on the company. Hanjin resultantly reduced it's ship orders, but still had seven ships delivered in the period 2010-2013, doubling company debt to $8Bn in the same period, just as the European interest rate crisis further cut back container demand.

To bring additional liquidity to the business, KAL acquired 33.2 percent of Hanjin Shipping in June 2014. By August 2016, the company owned only 44 per cent of the container fleet in operation, and the rest was chartered-in. By FY2015, container shipping rates were 8% below those in FY2010, resulting in financial losses on many routes, bringing a huge strain to the companies balance sheet.

Bankruptcy

Liquidation
In April 2016, Hanjin applied to its creditors for debt restructuring, in order to avoid formal insolvency proceedings. Hanjin Shipping's creditors withdrew their support after deeming a funding plan by parent company Hanjin inadequate.

On 31 August 2016, Hanjin filed for receivership at the Seoul Central District Court and requested the court to freeze its assets, after losing support from its banks the previous day. After Hanjin's receivership was publicized, creditors confiscated assets and Hanjin vessels experienced access issues in ports globally because service providers were not informed if and how they would be paid to load and unload Hanjin vessels .

On 2 September 2016 Hanjin Shipping Co. filed papers in U.S. Bankruptcy court in Newark, New Jersey that would allow its vessels to dock without its ships, cargo or equipment being confiscated by creditors.

Shortly after its receivership, experts predicted Hanjin Shipping was likely to be liquidated. In the following months, Hanjin Shipping announced it would shut down offices around the world, lay-off workers, sell remaining assets, and discontinue most services.

On 17 February 2017, Hanjin Shipping Co. was declared bankrupt by South Korean courts.

Aftermath and legacy

Hanjin Shipping was the largest bankruptcy in the container transport industry and it caused worldwide supply chain and shipping disruption as cargo ships were left stuck at ports and canals waiting for cash payments. Hanjin's bankruptcy created a massive ripple effect. Other businesses that rely on physical products found themselves without the expected revenue from inventory that became stuck at sea. The containers of other container ship companies also became stranded on Hanjin vessels. Hanjin collapsed at an especially inconvenient time for retailers furnishing their inventories with imported items in preparation for a seasonal uptick in Thanksgiving, Christmas, Black Friday, and New Year's sales. Although large companies such as Nike were affected, the repercussions were more prominent on smaller companies.

In February 2017, SM Line, a new shipping firm formed by Samra Midas (SM) Group, purchased five vessels previously owned by Hanjin. In March, SM Line acquired two of Hanjin Shipping's terminals in Korea, in the cities of Gwangyang and Incheon.

In August 2017, a South Korean bankruptcy trustee which was appointed to manage the liquidation of Hanjin Shipping reported that it had only collected 220 million USD from the sale of Hanjin's assets. This sum amounts to only 2% of the US$10.5 billion total debt Hanjin owes to its creditors.

Services
 Container – Transported approximately 3.7 million TEU containers a year. This service consisted of 24 container ships which allowed for this service to produce such an output per year. In 2010 Hanjin was the first to introduce a 10,000 TEU class carrier ship, which travelled between Asia and Europe.
 Bulk - This division of the shipping company delivered a variety of resources and raw materials through its ‘contract of affreightment’ with other companies. The division's ships were LNG and VLCC ships which carried crude oil and chemicals.
 Terminal – The shipping terminals for this company were distributed internationally. There were fourteen dock yards that this company owned: four in Korea, two in the United States of America, two in Japan, and the rest in Spain, Taiwan, Vietnam and Belgium.

Fleet

See also
 Top container shipping companies
 HMM (company)
 EUKOR
 Hyundai Glovis

References

External links

 

Companies based in Seoul
Transport companies established in 1977
Container shipping companies
Hanjin Group
Shipping companies of South Korea
Transport companies disestablished in 2017
South Korean companies established in 1977
2017 disestablishments in South Korea
Companies that have filed for bankruptcy in South Korea